The Songs About Jane Tour is the debut concert tour by American band Maroon 5. Kicking off in the fall of 2003, the tour promote their debut album, Songs About Jane (2002). Visiting Europe, the Americas, Asia and Australia, the band played 180 shows over the course of 15 months. Before starting the tour and in-between legs of the tour, the band served as the opening act for artists and groups are: Dave Matthews, Michelle Branch, Vanessa Carlton, Graham Colton Band, O.A.R., Jason Mraz, Matchbox Twenty, John Mayer, Nikka Costa, Counting Crows, Lenny Kravitz and Sheryl Crow; alongside playing radio, college and music festivals.

Opening acts
 Gavin DeGraw 
 Sara Bareilles 
 Ingram Hill 
 Marc Broussard 
 Michael Tolcher 
 Big City Rock 
 Jason Mraz 
 Maxeen 
 Kane 
 Guster 
 Melbourne  
 Matt Lewis Band 
 Johnathan Rice 
 The Like 
 Thirsty Merc 
 Phantom Planet

Setlist
The following setlist was obtained from the concert held on March 23, 2004, at Logo in Hamburg, Germany. It does not represent all concerts for the duration of the tour.
"Not Coming Home"
"The Sun"
"This Love"
"Tangled"
"Woman"
"Must Get Out"
"Harder to Breathe"
"Wasted Years"
"Sunday Morning"
"Shiver"
Encore
"She Will Be Loved"
"Sweetest Goodbye"

Shows

Festivals and other miscellaneous performances

This concert was a part of the "Now & Zen Festival"
This concert was a part of the "Jim Beam Concert Series"
This concert was a part of "Maroon Fridays"
This concert was a part of the "Spring Weekend Concert"
This concert was a part of the "Spring Concert"
This concert was a part of the "Lawnparties"
This concert was a part of "SunCom Concerts at The Point"
This concert was a part of "Your Show"
This concert was a part of "Wango Tango"
This concert was a part of "Zootopia"
This concert was a part of the "Kiss Concert"
This concert was a part of the "San Diego County Fair"
This concert was a part of "Red, White and Boom"
This concert was a part of the "Antelope Valley Fair"
This concert was a part of the "Ralph's Supermarket Concert Series"
This concert was a part of the "SWR3 New Pop Festival"
This concert was a part of "Mixfest"
This concert was a part of the "Western Washington Fair"

Cancellations and rescheduled shows

References

2003 concert tours
2004 concert tours
2005 concert tours
Maroon 5 concert tours
Concert tours of Asia
Concert tours of Canada
Concert tours of North America
Concert tours of South America
Concert tours of Europe
Concert tours of the United States